Banwarilal Purohit (born 16 April 1940) is an Indian politician who is the current and 29th Governor of Punjab, India and Administrator of Chandigarh as of 29 August 2021. He was the former Governor of Tamil Nadu from 2017 to 2021, and former Governor of Assam from 2016 to 2017. He is a member of the Bharatiya Janata Party. He was a Member of Parliament from the Nagpur (Lok Sabha constituency) three times, twice as an Indian National Congress member, once as a BJP member.

Political career
Later he joined Congress. After Indira Gandhi split the Congress Party and formed Congress (Indira), Purohit was elected as MLA from Nagpur East constituency in 1978, contesting as member of Congress(I), and he was re-elected in 1980 from Nagpur South and became a Minister of State for Urban Development, Slum Improvement and Housing in 1982.

In 1984, he was elected to the 8th Lok Sabha as member of Congress Party. He was re-elected in 1989 on Congress ticket.

Later he joined the Bharatiya Janata Party when it launched a movement to build Ram Temple in Ayodhya and contested Lok Sabha elections in 1991 as the BJP candidate. But he lost to Datta Meghe of Indian National Congress. In 1996, he was elected to 11th Lok Sabha as BJP's candidate.

In 1999, he quit the Bharatiya Janata Party to join the Indian National Congress after he developed serious differences with Pramod Mahajan. He contested the Lok Sabha elections from Ramtek in 1999 but lost.

In 2003, he launched his own party called Vidarbha Rajya Party and contested the Lok Sabha elections from Nagpur in 2004 but lost.   

Later on, he again joined the BJP.         

In 2009, he again contested on BJP's ticket but lost the election to Vilas Muttemwar of Indian National Congress.

Governorship

In August 2016, Purohit was appointed Governor of Assam by replacing Padmanabha Acharya who had additional in-charge of Assam.

On 30 September 2017 he was appointed Governor of Tamil Nadu by President Ram Nath Kovind. It was the first time that the state has got a full time governor after K Rosaiah retired in August 2016.

On August 27, 2021 President of India Shri Ram Nath Kovind appointed Governor Purohit as a Governor of Punjab (Additional Charge) and Administrator of Chandigarh (Additional Charge).

On September 9, 2021 President of India Shri Ram Nath Kovind appointed Governor Purohit as a 29th Governor of Punjab.

Other career
Purohit gained ownership of the Nagpur daily newspaper The Hitavada from Servants of India Society in 1979. The newspaper was launched by Gopal Krishna Gokhale in 1911 and Purohit is its current managing editor. He is also the chairman of Shri Ramdeobaba College of Engineering and Management in Nagpur.

Early life 
His father's name is Bhagwandas Purohit, he is married to Pushpa Devi Purohit, and he has three children. Two sons Rajendra Purohit and Rakesh Purohit, daughter Meena Purohit Joshi. He has six grandchildren and a great grandson. He is also the chairman of Bhavans Bhagwandas Purohit Vidya Mandir Nagpur. He is the chairman of Bharatiya Vidya Bhavan schools founded by late Kanaiyalal Maneklal Munshi in 1938.

References

|-

|-

|-

|-

|-

|-

https://brandequity.economictimes.indiatimes.com/news/marketing/eyantra-acquires-digital-marketing-agency-digital-ozone/82292182

India MPs 1984–1989
India MPs 1989–1991
India MPs 1996–1997
People from Jhunjhunu district
All India Forward Bloc politicians
Indian National Congress politicians
Bharatiya Janata Party politicians from Maharashtra
Living people
Lok Sabha members from Maharashtra
Governors of Assam
1939 births
Governors of Tamil Nadu
Politicians from Nagpur